Nelly's Folly is a 1961 Warner Bros. Merrie Melodies cartoon short written and directed by Chuck Jones. The short was released on December 30, 1961. It was nominated for an Academy Award for Best Animated Short Film  in 1962.

A singing giraffe leaves the jungle to pursue a singing career, but finds herself lonely and out of work following an affair.

This cartoon may well have been at least part of what inspired "Money Becomes King" by Tom Petty.

Plot
The cartoon opens as a camera pans across the continent of Africa where the narrator describes how dark and terrifying it is, amid jungle sounds and roars. As the camera pans across the darkest area, we hear the melodious sound of someone singing. A second later, the camera opens on a singing giraffe named Nelly, who is performing for her animal friends. A hunter appears from out of the bush, surprised at the sight of this singing giraffe and remarks, "I wouldn't have believed it if I hadn't hoid (heard) it with me own eyes!", and immediately has Nelly sign a contract offering her fame and fortune.

Nelly waves a tearful goodbye to her friends in the jungle as she leaves for civilization, captivated by the idea of show business. Once she arrives in New York City, she is put to work singing jingles for "Algonquin Rutabaga Tonic" - a cure for ailments, puts on live stage shows, and produces a line of giraffe-neck sweaters. The camera closes in on a turtle reading a magazine article on the giraffe-neck clothing. His head turns toward the camera and he says, "Well, that's show business".

Nelly releases several albums, but, over time, becomes lonely and disenchanted with fame and longs for male companionship. One day, she wanders into the Zoo and falls in love with a male giraffe, but she finds out he's already married (albeit unhappily, as the "wife" catches him looking at her). Scandal ensues and her agent tells her she's ruining her career (reduced to performing in empty opera houses and taking roles in foreign movies). She leaves show business to go back to her lover in the zoo, who is back together with his wife and wants nothing to do with a "has-been" celebrity. A devastated Nelly quits show business and goes back to Africa.

Back in Africa, Nelly is seen singing a beautiful love song, her sad reflection in a pond, tears dripping from her eyes, and from the eyes of her jungle friends. Moments later, a large male giraffe begins singing along with her and, as if all the darkness in her life disappears, the two fall in love and the cartoon ends right then and there.

Crew
Animation: Richard Thompson, Ben Washam, Tom Ray & Ken Harris
Layouts: Maurice Noble
Backgrounds: Philip DeGuard
Film Editor: Treg Brown
Voice Characterizations: Gloria Wood, Mel Blanc & Ed Prentiss
Music: Milt Franklyn
Produced by David H. DePatie & John W. Burton
Co-Directors: Maurice Noble & Abe Levitow
Story: Dave Detiege & Chuck Jones
Directed by Chuck Jones

Music
 "Auld Lang Syne"
 "The Flower of Gower Gulch" from Drip-Along Daffy, written by Michael Maltese
 "Voices of Spring", by Johann Strauss
 "Aloha Oe", by Queen Liliuokalani
 "Columbia, Gem of the Ocean", aka "The Red, White and Blue"
 "Then You'll Remember Me", from Balfe's opera "The Bohemian Girl"

Home media
"Nelly's Folly" is included on the Warner Bros. Home Entertainment Academy Awards Animation Collection and Looney Tunes Platinum Collection: Volume 3.  It was also included on the DVD release of the Warner Bros. film Sex and the Single Woman.

References

External links
 

1961 films
1961 animated films
1961 short films
Merrie Melodies short films
Short films directed by Chuck Jones
Films directed by Abe Levitow
Films directed by Maurice Noble
Films scored by Milt Franklyn
Animated films about animals
1960s Warner Bros. animated short films
1960s English-language films
Films set in Africa
Animated films set in New York City
Films about adultery in the United States
Films about singers